Hans Bertram (26 February 1906 – 8 January 1993) was a German aviator, screenwriter and film director.

Biography

Early life
Hans Bertram was born on 26 February 1906 in Remscheid, Germany.

Career 
During 1920, Bertram trained under flying instructor Paul Bäumer, a noted German aviator of World War I, at Hamburg Fuhlsbuttel Airport.

From 1927, Bertram was an aviation advisor to the government of the Republic of China and was involved in establishing its naval aviation service.

When Bertram piloted a Junkers W 33 seaplane on an around-the world flight during 1932, he became lost over a sparsely-populated part of the Kimberley region of Western Australia and made a forced landing. Bertram and mechanic Adolf Klausmann were rescued and hospitalised in Perth. Klausmann suffered significant long-term psychological effects from their ordeal. Books by Bertram regarding his adventures became best-sellers in Germany during 1933.

In 1934, Bertram joined the Nazi Party and the SA ("Brownshirts").

Bertram's script for a drama set in an Australian gold mining town, was made into Frauen für Golden Hill ("Women for Golden Hill"), released in 1938. The World War I aviation drama D III 88 (1939), also written by Bertram, was made with the support of Luftwaffe chief Hermann Göring. Another script by Bertram (based on a novel by Nicola Rhon), was endorsed by the Nazis: Der Fuchs von Glenarvon ("The Fox of Glenarvon") set in Ireland during the 1880s and concerned with Irish opposition to British rule was released in 1940.

During World War II, Bertram wrote and directed two feature-length propaganda-oriented documentaries about German aviators. While on active service with the Luftwaffe during 1941, he was shot down in Libya and taken prisoner. Bertram was sent to POW camps in Australia (where he was to remain for the duration of the war).

Meanwhile, in Germany, release of Bertram's film  ("Symphony of a Life") was suspended when it was found that he had employed Jews, such as the lead actor Harry Baur. Bertram's membership of the Reich Chamber of Culture was suspended and when Symphonie eines Lebens was released (1942), the names of Bertram, the rest of the crew and cast were omitted from the credits.

Bertram wrote the scripts of 10 films completed between 1938 and 1985, and directed six films.

In 1985, the Australian Broadcasting Corporation screened Flight into Hell, a television miniseries based on Bertram's accounts of his experiences during 1932.

German language books authored by Bertram
 1933: Flug in die Hölle. Mein australisches Abenteuer. Frankfurt/Berlin; Ullstein.
 1933: Flug in die Hölle. Bericht von der „Bertram-Atlantis-Expedition“. Berlin; Drei Masken Verlag.
 1937: Ruf der weiten Welt. Berlin; Drei Masken Verlag.
 1954: Flug zu den Sternen. München/Wien/Basel; Verlag Kurt Desch.
 1980: Götterwind. Pioniere der Luftfahrt. Frankfurt/Berlin; Universitas. (A revised edition of Flug zu den Sternen.)

Filmography 
 1938: Frauen für Golden Hill a.k.a. Women for Golden Hill (scriptwriter)
 1939: D III 88 (scriptwriter, in collaboration with Wolf Neumeister)
 1940: . ["Baptism of Fire. Film from Operations by our Air Force in Poland] (director; scriptwriter)
 1940: Der Fuchs von Glenarvon a.k.a. The Fox of Glenarvon (scriptwriter)
 1941:  ["Bomber Wing Lützow"]  (director, line producer, scriptwriter)
 1942:  ["Symphony of a Life"] (director, line producer, scriptwriter)
 1949: Eine große Liebe  a.k.a. True Love (director; scriptwriter)
 1950: Der verzauberte Klang ["The Enchanted Sound"] (short documentary) (director)
 1952: Türme des Schweigens a.k.a. Towers of Silence (director; scriptwriter)

Personal life
He was married to German actress Gisela Uhlen. Bertram died on 8 January 1993 in Munich, Germany.

References

External links
 

1906 births
1993 deaths
Film people from North Rhine-Westphalia
Sturmabteilung personnel
German World War II pilots
German prisoners of war in World War II
World War II prisoners of war held by Australia
German male writers
Shot-down aviators
People from Remscheid